The 2011 M-1 Challenge season was the fourth season of mixed martial arts (MMA) fighting presented by the M-1 Global promotion. The season began on March 5.

Events

M-1 Challenge XXIII: Grishin vs. Guram
The first M-1 Challenge event of 2011 took place on March 5, 2011, at the Crocus City in Moscow, Russia.

Main card (Russia 2 TV)
Heavyweight Championship bout:  Guram Gugenishvili (c) vs.  Maxim Grishin
Gugenishvili defeated Grishin via submission (rear-naked choke) at 3:03 of round 1.
Welterweight Championship bout:  Shamil Zavurov vs.  Tom Gallicchio
Zavurov defeated Gallicchio via TKO (strikes) at 1:11 of round 2.
Welterweight bout:  Rashid Magomedov vs.   Rafał Moks
Magomedov defeated Moks via TKO (strikes) at 2:06 of round 1.
Lightweight bout:  Mairbek Taisumov vs.  Yuri Ivlev
Taisumov defeated Ivlev via TKO (punches) at 1:34 of round 2.
Middleweight bout:  Magomed Sultanakhmedov vs.  Plinio Cruz
Sultanakhmedov defeated Cruz via TKO (strikes) at 1:11 of round 2.

Preliminary card (stream on mixfight.ru)
Middleweight bout:  Magomedrasul Khasbulaev vs.  Daniel Weichel
Weichel defeated Magomedrasul via technical submission (triangle choke) at 3:13 of round 1.
Heavyweight bout:  Goncalo Salgado vs.  Arsen Abdulkerimov
Abdulkerimov defeated Salgado via submission (armbar) at 2:29 of round 1.
Light heavyweight bout:  Igor Savelyev vs.  Byron Byrd
Saveliev defeated Byrd via submission (rear-naked choke) at 2:12 of round 2.
Light heavyweight bout:  Shamil Tinagadjiev vs.  Tomasz Narkun
Narkun defeated Tinagadjiev via submission (triangle choke) at 3:33 of round 1.
Light heavyweight bout:  Maxim Bulahtin vs.  Magomed Ismailov
Ismailov defeated Bulahtin via submission (rear-naked choke) at 0:47 of round 2.
Lightweight bout:  Vusal Bairamov vs.  Nikolai Kaushansky
Kaushansky defeated Bairamov via submission (rear-naked choke) at 1:31 of round 1.

M-1 Challenge XXIV: Damkovsky vs. Figueroa
The second M-1 Challenge event took place on March 25, 2011, at the Ted Constant Convocation Center in Norfolk, Virginia.  This event marked the first M-1 show in the United States since 2009 and aired live on the Showtime cable network. The event drew an estimated 189,000 viewers on Showtime.

Due to problems with his visa Arthur Guseinov was unable to compete. Josh Bakkalao got injured during practice and was unable to face Alexander Sarnavskiy. He was replaced by Beau Baker.

Main card (Showtime TV)
Lightweight Championship bout:  Artiom Damkovsky (c) vs.  Jose Figueroa
Figueroa defeated Damkovsky via TKO (punches) at 2:28 of round 2 to become the new M-1 Global Lightweight Champion.
Middleweight Championship bout:  Magomed Sultanakhmedov vs.  Tyson Jeffries
Sultanakhmedov defeated Jeffries via TKO (knees to the body) at 3:07 of round 2.
Light heavyweight bout:  Vinny Magalhaes vs.  Jake Doerr
Magalhaes defeated Doerr via TKO (punches) at 1:47 of round 1.  
Middleweight bout:  Jason Norwood vs.  Mojo Horne
Norwood defeated Horne by unanimous decision (30-27, 30-27, 30-27).
Lightweight bout:  Alexander Sarnavskiy vs.  Beau Baker
Sarnavskiy defeated Baker via submission (rear-naked choke) at 2:32 of round 2.

Preliminary card
Bantamweight bout:  Marcus Daniels vs.  Bryan Lasham
Lasham defeated Daniels via TKO (punches) at 0:57 of round 1.
Featherweight bout:  Bethany Marshall vs.  Stacy Grant
Marshall defeated Grant via submission (toe hold) at 1:49 of round 2.
Welterweight bout:  Brian Nielson vs.  Colton Smith
Smith defeated Nielson via submission (rear-naked choke) at 4:19 of round 1.
Heavyweight bout:  Johnny Curtis vs.  Bobby Gurley
Curtis defeated Gurley via KO (punch to the body) at 0:36 of round 1.
Lightweight bout:  George Sheppard vs.  David Derby
Sheppard defeated Derby via TKO (punches) at 1:50 of round 1.
Bantamweight bout:  Jessie Riggleman vs.  Jason Hilliker
Riggleman defeated Hilliker via submission (guillotine choke) at 3:13 of round 1.

M-1 Challenge XXV: Zavurov vs. Enomoto
28 April 2011 Ice Palace Saint Petersburg in St.Petersburg, Russia.
Today it was announced that Dmitry Samoilov and Mike Guerin were injured during the training process and, unfortunately, will not be able to take part in the tournament M-1 Challenge XXV. Zavurov vs Magomedov. Rashid Magomedov was seriously injured and was out of title bout with Shamil Zavurov. M-1 Global has made every effort to in such a short period of time to find a worthy replacement, and literally a few minutes ago to sign the exclusive contract with M-1 Global has put Swiss welterweight Yasubi Enomoto, who last year was a finalist at the Grand Prix at Sengoku in his weight class.

Main card (Russia 2 TV)
Welterweight Championship bout:  Shamil Zavurov (c) vs.  Yasubey Enomoto
Zavurov defeated Enomoto by unanimous decision (48-47, 48-47, 48-47).
Light Heavyweight Championship bout:  Viktor Nemkov vs.  Vinny Magalhaes
Magalhaes defeated Nemkov via submission (mounted gogoplata) at 1:40 of round 3.
Middleweight bout:  Andrei Semenov vs.  Luigi Fioravanti
Semenov defeated Fioravanti by unanimous decision (30-27, 30-27, 30-27).
Light Heavyweight bout:   Mikhail Zayats vs.  Malik Merad
Zayats defeated Merad via TKO (punches) at 0:49 of round 2.
Heavyweight bout:  Maxim Grishin vs.  Vladimir Kuchenko
Grishin defeated Kuchenko via TKO (punches) at 3:14 of round 3.
Heavyweight bout:  Alexander Volkov vs.  Denis Goltsov
Volkov defeated Goltsov via TKO (punches) at 3:05 of round 2.
Welterweight bout:  Alexander Yakovlev vs.  Christian Eckerlin
Yakovlev defeated Eckerlin via submission (rear-naked choke) at 3:14 of round 2.

Preliminary card (stream on mixfight.ru)
Welterweight bout:  Juan Manuel Suarez vs.  Arsen Temirkhanov
Suarez defeated Temirkhanov by unanimous decision (29-28, 29-28, 29-28).
Middleweight bout:  Murad Magomedov vs.  Ramazan Emeev
Emeev defeated Magomedov by unanimous decision (30-27, 29-28, 29-28).
Welterweight bout:  Ramazan Esenbaev vs.  Albert Akhmetov
Esenbaev defeated Akhmetov via TKO (punches) at 2:49 of round 2.

M-1 European Battle
June 4, 2011 ACCO International Center Kyiv, Ukraine

Main card (Ustream.com)
Welterweight bout:  Yasubey Enomoto vs.  Rafał Moks
Enomoto defeated Moks via majority decision (29-28, 28-28, 29-28).
Lightweight bout:  Yuri Ivlev vs.  Artiom Damkovsky
Ivlev defeated Damkovsky via unanimous decision (29-28, 29-28, 29-28).
Welterweight bout:  Alexander Agafonov vs.  Husein Haliev
Haliev defeated Agafonov via unanimous decision (30-27, 30-27, 30-27).
Lightweight bout:  Vugar Bakhshiev vs.  Antun Račić
Račić defeated Bakhshiev via submission (rear-naked choke) at 3:54 of 3 round.

Preliminary card
Lightweight bout:  Alexander Kozyr vs.  Semen Tyrlya
Kozyr defeated Tyrlya via submission (armbar) at 1:57 of 1 round.
Welterweight bout:  Vadim Khaitulov vs.  Viktor Talashov
Khaitulov defeated Talashov via TKO (punch) at 1:24 of 1 round.
Middleweight bout:  Ruslan Khaskhanov vs.  Andrei Dryapko
Dryapko defeated Khaskhanov via submission (shoulder injury) 1:57 of 1 round.
Light Heavyweight bout:  Saparbek Safarov vs.  Denis Ivanets
Safarov defeated Ivanets via TKO (punches) at 3:00 of 1 round.
Heavyweight bout:  Igor Zadernovsky vs.  Yuri Snegovskoy
Zadernovsky  defeated Snegovskoy via submission (armbar) at 2:01 of 1 round.

European Gran Prix
Lightweight bout:  Farkhad Fatalla vs.  Ilya Tiunov
Fatalla defeated Tiunov via Submission (guillotine choke) at 1:48 of 1 round. 
Lightweight bout:  Serhiy Adamchuk vs.  Sergey Sinkevich
Adamchuk defeated Sinkevich via KO (punch) at 2:47 of 2 round.
Welterweight bout:  Vladimir Opanasenko vs.  Syanan Yusibov
Opanasenko defeated Yusibov via submission (armbar) at 0:41 of 1 round.
Welterweight bout:  Vasily Novikov vs.  Alexander Nimerenko
Novikov defeated Nimerenko via submission (armbar) at 3:10 of 2 round.
Middleweight bout:  Alexander Dolotenko vs.  Filip Anasovich
Dolotenko defeated Anasovich via submission (armbar) at 1:15 of 1 round.

M-1 Challenge XXVI: Bennett vs. Garner II
The second M-1 Challenge event to air on Showtime took place on July 8, 2011, in Costa Mesa, California.  Guram Gugenishvili was originally announced for the main event, but suffered a hand injury and was replaced by Garner.

Main card (Showtime TV)
Heavyweight bout:  Kenny Garner vs.  Pat Bennett
Garner defeated Bennett via KO (punch) at 1:15 of round 2.
Middleweight bout:  Arthur Guseinov vs.  Tyson Jeffries
Guseinov defeated Jeffries via KO (back fist) at 1:32 of round 1.
Lightweight bout:  Mairbek Taisumov vs.  Josh Bakkalao
Taisumov defeated Bakkalao via KO (punch) at 2:01 of round 1.
Lightweight bout:  Daniel Weichel vs.  Beau Baker
Weichel defeated Baker by unanimous decision (30-27, 30-27, 30-25).
Middleweight bout:  Eddie Arizmendi vs.  Jason Norwood
Arizmendi defeated Norwood via KO (punch) at 4:55 of round 2.

Preliminary card (Allboxing.tv)
Lightweight bout:  Max Martyniouk vs.  Mike De Robles
Martyniouk defeated Robles via TKO (punches) at 2:30 of 1 round.
Lightweight bout:  Diman Morris vs.  Brandon Michaels
Morris defeated Michaels by split decision (29-28, 27-30, 29-28).

М-1 Challenge XXVII: Magalhaes vs. Zayats
The third M-1 Challenge show on Showtime took place on October 14, 2011, at the Grand Canyon University Arena in Phoenix, Arizona.

Heavyweight champion Guram Gugenishvili was originally set to defend his title in a rematch against Kenny Garner, but pulled out of the bout due to an elbow injury.

Main card (Showtime TV)
Light Heavyweight Championship bout:  Vinny Magalhaes (c) vs.  Mikhail Zayats
Magalhaes defeated Zayats via TKO (head kick and punches) at 1:13 of round 3.
Heavyweight Interim Championship bout:   Kenny Garner vs.  Maxim Grishin
Garner defeated Grishin via submission (punches) at 4:07 of round 5.
Middleweight bout:  Eddie Arizmendi vs.  Arthur Guseinov
Guseinov defeated Arizmendi via submission (heel hook) at 0:50 of round 1.
Welterweight bout:  Josh Thorpe vs.  Yasubey Enomoto
Enomoto defeated Thorpe via submission (triangle choke) at 1:07 of round 1.
Welterweight bout:  Tom Gallicchio vs.  Daniel Madrid
Madrid defeated Gallicchio via submission (armbar) at 0:48 of round 1.

Preliminary card
Catchweight (158 lbs) bout:  Ryan Crouch vs.  Fredrik Lumpkin
Crouch defeated Lumpkin via TKO (punches) at 2:26 of round 2. 
Welterweight bout:  Mike Chavez vs.  Joe Martinez
Chavez defeated Martinez via split decision (29–28, 28–29, 29–28).

M-1 Challenge XXVIII: Emelianenko vs. Malikov
12 November, Star Centre, Astrakhan, Astrakhan Oblast

Shamil Zavurov was expected to defend his title against Rashid Magomedov on this card, but had to withdraw due to knee injury.

Main Card (PPV and Russia 2)
Heavyweight bout:  Alexander Emelianenko vs.  Magomed Malikov
Malikov defeated Emelianenko via KO (punches) at 0:23 of round 1
Light Heavyweight bout:  Alihan Magomedov vs.  Isaiah Larson
Larson defeated Magomedov  via submission (armbar) at 3:41 of round 2
Lightweight bout:  Vugar Bakhshiev vs.  Yves Landu
Bakhshiev defeated Landu by split decision (30–27, 27–29, 29–27)

Preliminary card
Middleweight bout:  Anton Kostishchin vs.  David Beaudrier
Beaudrier defeated Kostishchin via submission (arm-triangle choke) at 2:48 of round 2

M-1 Selection: GP 84 kg
Middleweight bout:  Enoc Solves Torres vs.  Ruslan Khaskhanov
Torres defeated Khaskhanov via TKO (punches) at 1:00 of round 1
Middleweight bout:  Jan Zdansky vs.  Anatoly Tokov
Tokov defeated Zdansky via TKO (punches) at 4:20 of round 1
Middleweight bout:  Sunay Hamidov vs.  Alexei Martinov
Hamidov defeated Martinov via submission (triangle choke) at N/A of round 3
Middleweight bout:  Gregory Babene vs.  Alexander Dolotenko
Babene defeated Dolotenko via submission (triangle choke) at 3:33 of round 1

M-1 Challenge XXIX: Samoilov vs. Miranda
19 November, Ufa Arena, Ufa, Bashkortostan

Vyacheslav Vasilevsky again was traumatized in a hand and according to its command, doctors have forbidden it to act until January, 2012.

Main Card
Middleweight bout:  Dmitry Samoilov vs.  Mario Miranda
Miranda defeated Samoilov via submission (kimura) at 3:58 of round 2
Lightweight bout:  Antun Račić vs.  Artiom Damkovsky
Damkovsky defeated  Račić via KO (slam) at 2:16 of round 1
Middleweight bout:  Arsen Temirkhanov vs.  Christian Eckerlin
Temirkhanov defeated Eckerlin via submission (armbar) at 2:31 of round 1
Welterweight bout:  Erik Oganov vs.  Daniel Madrid
Oganov defeated Madrid via submission (armbar) at 1:24 of round 2
Middleweight bout:  Magomed Aropkhanov vs.  Marat Gafurov
Gafurov defeated Aropkhanov by split decision (30–27, 28–29, 29–28).
Middleweight bout:  Ramazan Emeev vs.  Ruslan Nadzhafaliev
Emeev defeated Nadzhafaliev via submission (rear-naked choke) at 2:50 of round 2
Welterweight bout:  Julio Cesar de Almeida vs.  Bahtiyar Arzumanov
Almeida defeated Arzumanov by unanimous decision (29–28, 29–28, 30–27).

Preliminary card
Heavyweight bout:  Mikhail Istomin vs.  Timur Shihmagomedov
Istomin defeated Shihmagomedov via TKO (punches) at 0:24 of round 2

M-1 Selection: GP +93 kg
Heavyweight bout:  Denis Komkin vs.  Ruslan Stepanyan
Goltsov defeated Stepanyan via КО (punches) at 1:34 of round 1
Heavyweight bout:  Taimur Aslanov vs.  Denis Goltsov
Goltsov defeated Aslanov via submission (triangle choke) at 1:55 of round 1
Heavyweight bout:  Akhmed Sultanov vs.  Vladimir Kuchenko
Sultanov defeated Kuchenko via submission (triangle choke) at 3:10 of round 1
Heavyweight bout:  Denis Smoldarev vs.  Niyazi Safarov
Smoldarev defeated Safarov via submission (armbar) at 2:10 of round 1

M-1 Global: Fedor vs. Monson

M-1 Global: Fedor vs. Monson  was a mixed martial arts event held by M-1 Global.  The event took place on November 20, 2011, at the Olympic Stadium in Moscow, Russia. In the main fight Fedor Emelianenko defeated Jeff Monson via unanimous decision.

At the end of the heavyweight bout, Vladimir Putin entered the ring to congratulate the winner, Fedor Emelianenko, and gave a speech.  The crowd booed during the speech; although some Russian media reports claimed that they had been booing the American loser, Jeff Monson, BBC News reported that several crowd members had stressed that they were booing Putin, and regarded Monson as an honorable loser.

Main card
Heavyweight bout:  Fedor Emelianenko vs.  Jeff Monson
Emelianenko defeated Monson by unanimous decision (30-27, 30-27, 30-27) .
Lightweight Championship bout:  Jose Figueroa (c) vs.  Daniel Weichel
Weichel defeated Figueroa via KO (punches) at 1:50 of round 1. Daniel became the new lightweight champion.
Welterweight bout:  Alexander Yakovlev vs.  Juan Manuel Suarez
Yakovlev defeated Suarez via TKO (punches) at 3:55 of round 2.
Lightweight bout:  Yuri Ivlev vs.  Jerome Bouisson
Ivlev defeated Bouisson via TKO (punch) at 1:00 of round 1.
Lightweight bout:  Mairbek Taisumov vs.  Joshua Thorpe
Taisumov defeated Thorpe via KO (punches) at 3:19 of round 2.
Middleweight bout:  Albert Duraev vs.  Xavier Foupa-Pokam
Duraev defeated Foupa-Pokam via submission (triangle choke) at 2:37 of round 2.

Preliminary card
Heavyweight bout:  Alexander Volkov vs.  Arsen Abdulkerimov
Volkov defeated Abdulkerimov via TKO (punches) at 1:00 of round 1.
Light Heavyweight bout:  Salim Davidov vs.  Sergey Kornev
Davidov defeated Kornev by unanimous decision.
Lightweight bout:  Mikhail Malyutin vs.  Seydina Seck
Malyutin defeated Seck via KO (punch) at 0:47 of round 1.
Lightweight bout:  Nicholas Kaushansky vs.  Alexander Vinogradov
Kaushansky defeated Vinogradov via submission (rear-naked choke) at 1:23 of round 2.

M-1 Challenge XXX: Shamil Zavurov vs. Yasubey Enomoto II
This event took place on December 9, 2011, at The Hangar at the O.C. Fair and Events Center in Costa Mesa, California.  It aired live on the Showtime cable network.

Alexander Sarnavskiy was scheduled to face Francisco Drinaldo, but the bout was cancelled when Drinaldo suffered an injury.  Sarnavskiy instead faced Sergio Cortez.

Main Card (Showtime)
Welterweight Championship bout:  Shamil Zavurov (c) vs.  Yasubey Enomoto
Enomoto defeated Zavurov via submission (guillotine choke) at 4:10 of Round 5.
Lightweight bout:  Artiom Damkovsky vs.  Jose Figueroa
Damkovsky defeated Figueroa via KO (punch) at 2:19 of Round 1.
Lightweight bout:  Alexander Sarnavskiy vs.  Sergio Cortez
Sarnavskiy defeated Cortez via submission (rear naked choke) at 1:46 of Round 1.
Middleweight bout:  Eddie Arizmendi vs.  Tyson Jeffries
Jeffries defeated Arizmendi via submission (d'arce choke) at 2:08 of Round 2.
Featherweight bout:  Alvin Cacdac vs.  Bao Quach
Quach defeated Cacdac via submission (triangle/armbar) at 3:33 of Round 1.

See also
M-1 Global

References

External links
 M-1 Global Homepage (in English)

M-1 Challenge Season
2011